Castro is an Iberian (i.e. Portuguese, Spanish, and Galician) surname coming from Latin castrum, a castle or fortress. Its English equivalent is  Chester

Geographical distribution
As of 2014, 19.2% of all known bearers of the surname Castro were residents of Mexico (frequency 1:254), 12.0% of Colombia (1:157), 10.0% of Brazil (1:801), 6.3% of the United States (1:2,249), 5.2% of Argentina (1:325), 4.8% of Peru (1:261), 4.7% of Spain (1:387), 4.0% of Venezuela (1:299), 3.9% of Chile (1:179), 3.0% of Ecuador (1:206), 2.6% of Honduras (1:134), 2.4% of Guatemala (1:269), 2.0% of Costa Rica (1:93), 1.8% of Cuba (1:251), 1.7% of Nicaragua (1:141), 1.5% of Bolivia (1:276), 1.5% of El Salvador (1:165), 1.5% of Portugal (1:278), 1.4% of the Dominican Republic (1:297) and 1.1% of Mozambique (1:1,011).

In Spain, the frequency of the surname was higher than national average (1:387) in the following autonomous communities:
 1. Galicia (1:95)
 2. Canary Islands (1:282)
 3. Andalusia (1:310)
 4. Asturias (1:338)

In Costa Rica, the frequency of the surname was higher than national average (1:93) in the following provinces:
 1. Alajuela Province (1:65)
 2. San José Province (1:75)

People
 Alicia Castro (born 1949), Argentine diplomat
 Alvaro Castro (born 1989), Argentine developer
 Américo Castro (1885–1972), Spanish historian
 Anabella Castro, Colombian model
 Ángel Castro y Argiz (1875–1956), father of Cuban leaders Fidel and Raúl Castro
 Anthony Castro (baseball) (born 1995), Venezuelan baseball player
 Ariel Castro (1960–2013), Puerto Rican American kidnapper and rapist
 Arles Castro (born 1979), Colombian track and road cyclist
 Arturo Castro (Mexican actor) (1918–1975)
 Arturo Castro (Guatemalan actor) (born 1985)
 Aureo Castro (1917–1993), Macanese–Portuguese composer, musician and teacher
 Balthazar (Isaac) Orobio de Castro, (c.1617–1687) Jewish philosopher
 Benjamin Castro (disambiguation), several people
 Bernadette Castro (born 1944), U.S. politician
 Carlos Castro (disambiguation), several people
 César Castro (diver) (born 1982), Brazilian diver
 Cipriano Castro (1858–1924), President of Venezuela
 Claudia Castro, Argentine LGBT activist
 Crispin Castro Monroy (born 1936), Mexican politician
 Cristian Castro (born 1974), Mexican singer
 Daniel Castro (disambiguation), several people
 David Castro (swimmer) (born 1964), Brazilian swimmer
 David Castro (actor) (born 1996), American actor
 Dionísio Castro (born 1963), Portuguese long-distance runner
 Domingos Castro (born 1963), Portuguese long-distance runner
 Eddie Castro (disambiguation), several people
 Eduardo Castro (born 1954), Mexican long-distance runner
 Eduardo Viveiros de Castro (born 1951), Brazilian ethnologist
 Elizabeth Castro, U.S. writer on web sites
 Fernando Castro (disambiguation)
 Fernando Ruiz de Castro (disambiguation)
 Fidel Castro (1926–2016), former First Secretary of the Communist Party of Cuba
 Fidel Castro (disambiguation), several people
 Francisco Castro (disambiguation), multiple people
 Germán Castro Caycedo (1940–2021), Colombian journalist and writer
 Giovanna Arbunic Castro (born 1964), Chilean chess player
 Gonzalo Castro (born 1987), German footballer
 Gonzalo Castro Irizábal (born 1984), Uruguayan footballer
 Guillén de Castro y Bellvis (1569–1631), Spanish dramatist
 Harold Castro (born 1993), Venezuelan baseball player
 Héctor Castro (1904–1960), Uruguayan footballer
 Henri Castro (1786–1865), pioneer of the Republic of Texas
 Inês de Castro (1325–1355), Galician noblewoman and Queen of Portugal after her death
 Isabel Castro (artist) (born 1954), Mexican-born American artist
 Israel Castro (disambiguation), several people
 Jason Castro (disambiguation), several people
 Jayson Castro (born 1986), Filipino basketball player
 Jesús Castro (disambiguation), several people
 Joaquin Castro (born 1974), American politician
 Jorge Castro (disambiguation), several people
 José Castro (disambiguation), several people
 Joseph Castro (disambiguation), several people
 Juan Castro (born 1972), Mexican baseball player
 Juan José Castro (1895–1968), Argentine composer
 Juanita Castro (born 1933), Cuban revolutionary, sister of Fidel and Raul Castro
 Julian Castro (born 1974), American politician
 Julián Castro Contreras (1810 – 1875), President of Venezuela 
 Kervin Castro (born 1999), Venezuelan baseball pitcher for the San Francisco Giants
 Luciano Castro (born 1975), Argentine actor
 Luís Castro (disambiguation), several people
 Luz Dary Castro (born 1978), Colombian shot putter and discus thrower
 Marco Castro (born 1976), a Peruvian American film director
 María Elisa Castro (born 1954), Argentine politician
 Mariela Castro (born 1962), Cuban LGBT and sex education activist, and daughter of Raúl Castro
 Mauricio Castro (born 1981), Honduran footballer
 Michael Castro (disambiguation), several people
 Miguel Castro (born 1994), Dominican professional baseball player
 Nelson Castro (disambiguation), several people
 Oscar Castro (disambiguation), several people
 Pedro Fernández de Castro (disambiguation), several people
 Plácido de Castro (disambiguation), several people
 Ramón Castro (disambiguation), several people
 Raquel Castro (born 1994), American actress
 Raul Hector Castro (1916–2015), U.S. politician
 Raúl Castro (born 1931), First Secretary of the Communist Party of Cuba
 Raúl Castro (disambiguation), several people
 Roberto Michael Castro (born 1989), Ecuadorian footballer
 Rodolfo Castro (born 1999), Dominican baseball player
 Rosalía de Castro (1837–1885), Spanish Galician language writer and poet
 Sal Castro (1933–2013), Mexican-American educator and activist
 Saleta Castro (born 1989), a Spanish (Galician) triathlete
 Salvador Castaneda Castro (1888–1965), Salvadorian politician
 Sebastian Castro (disambiguation), several people
 Sergio de Castro (disambiguation), several people
 Sheilla Castro (born 1983), Brazilian volleyball player
 Starlin Castro (born 1990), Dominican baseball player
 Verónica Castro (born 1952), Mexican actress
 Willi Castro (born 1997), Puerto Rican baseball player
 Xiomara Castro (born 1959), Honduran politician
 Zulema Castro de Peña (c. 1920–2013), Argentine activist

References

See also
House of Castro
Duke of Castro (disambiguation)
de Castro
Castro (disambiguation)
Chester (surname)

Galician-language surnames
Portuguese-language surnames